The Moroccan national handball team is the national handball team of Morocco and is controlled by the Royal Moroccan Handball Federation based in Rabat, Morocco.

Results

World Championship
 1995 – 22nd
 1997 – 23rd
 1999 – 17th
 2001 – 22nd
 2003 – 23rd
 2007 – 20th
 2021 – 29th
 2023 – 30th

African Championship

Red border color indicates tournament was held on home soil.

Team

Current squad
Squad for the 2023 World Men's Handball Championship.

Head coach: Noureddine Bouhaddioui

Famous past players
 Mohamed Berraja
 Ismail Bouhadioui
 Mohamed Nouri
 Karim Bouhadioui
 Payton Kuhn
 Connor Erdman

References

External links
IHF profile

 

Men's national handball teams
Handball in Morocco
Handball